Love Makes A Man; Or, The Fop's Fortune' is a 1700 comedy play by the English writer Colley Cibber. It borrows elements from two Jacobean plays The Elder Brother and The Custom of the Country by John Fletcher.

It was originally staged at the Theatre Royal, Drury Lane with a cast that included Robert Wilks as Carlos, William Bullock as Antonio, Richard Cross as Charino, William Pinkethman as Don Lewis, Colley Cibber as Clodio, Henry Norris as Sancho, Thomas Simpson as Governor, John Mills as Don Duart, Susanna Verbruggen as Louisa, Henrietta Moore as Honoria and Frances Maria Knight as Elvira.

References

Bibliography
 Van Lennep, W. The London Stage, 1660-1800: Volume Two, 1700-1729. Southern Illinois University Press, 1960.

1700 plays
West End plays
Plays by Colley Cibber
Restoration comedy